The Daily Express National Five-a-Sides was an annual indoor football tournament for Football League clubs across England, with Scottish League clubs invited on occasions. The competition was contested between 1968 and 1986 (and televised up to 1983).

History 
The competition was held at Wembley Arena to packed crowds of between 8,000 and 10,000. It was sponsored by the Daily Express. The competition was a covered by the BBC and highlighted on their Wednesday Sportsnight programme. The last televised edition was in 1983.

Scottish football teams received invites. Other indoor tournaments popular around this time included Evening Standard London Five-a-Side (around since 1954) and Guinness Soccer Six (inspired by MISL) competitions. Both Five-a-Side tournaments shared a home at the Wembley Arena between 1968 and 1986.

Matches were split in two four minute halves. Time limits for matches increased as the tournament progressed. Though match lengths altered over the years. Any drawn matches were resolved with a penalty shoot-out. The rules included no passbacks to the goalkeeper and the ball must remain below shoulder height.

List of Finals

See also
Tennents' Sixes

References

External links
Sportsnight With Coleman History BBC.
Midweek Football Coverage: 1968/69 to 1982/83 ITV Football.
Football Tournament Programmes AB Football Programmes.

Indoor soccer competitions
Defunct football cup competitions in England
Football competitions in London
Recurring sporting events established in 1968
Recurring sporting events disestablished in 1986
1968 establishments in England
1986 disestablishments in England
Daily Express